Cheneyville is a town in Rapides Parish, Louisiana, United States. It is part of the Alexandria, Louisiana Metropolitan Statistical Area. The population was 625 at the 2010 census.

History
The town was named for settler William Cheney.

Cheneyville is significant in the history of the Restoration Movement associated with Alexander Campbell. In 1843 most of the membership of a Baptist congregation, under the leadership of William Prince Ford, who had been influenced by Campbell's writings, became a Church of Christ. The Cheneyville Christian Church is the oldest congregation associated with the Restoration Movement in Louisiana. In 1857, Campbell visited the congregation and was favorably impressed by its fellowship between the races.

Ford is also known as the original enslaver of Solomon Northup, the main character in the feature film, Twelve Years a Slave.  Northup was an African-American who had been born free, but kidnapped in Washington, D.C., and sold to Ford in New Orleans in 1841.

Notable people

C. H. "Sammy" Downs lived in Cheneyville.
Wilbur Dyer, state representative from south Rapides Parish from 1974 to 1980
Sue Eakin, author and editor of Twelve Years a Slave.
Leroy Augustus Stafford, a Rapides Parish planter and brigadier general in the Confederate Army.

Geography

Demographics

2020 census

As of the 2020 United States census, there were 468 people, 275 households, and 156 families residing in the town.

2000 census
As of the census of 2000, there were 901 people, 267 households, and 183 families residing in the town. The racial makeup of the town was 33.07% White, 65.70% African American, 0.33% Native American, 0.55% from other races, and 0.33% from two or more races. Hispanic or Latino of any race were 2.33% of the population.

There were 267 households, out of which 28.5% had children under the age of 18 living with them, 39.7% were married couples living together, 26.2% had a female householder with no husband present, and 31.1% were non-families. 28.5% of all households were made up of individuals, and 14.6% had someone living alone who was 65 years of age or older. The average household size was 2.71 and the average family size was 3.39.

In the town, the population was spread out, with 24.0% under the age of 18, 10.2% from 18 to 24, 30.4% from 25 to 44, 22.6% from 45 to 64, and 12.8% who were 65 years of age or older. The median age was 36 years. For every 100 females, there were 103.8 males. For every 100 females age 18 and over, there were 102.1 males.

The median income for a household in the town was $19,044, and the median income for a family was $21,917. Males had a median income of $21,250 versus $12,159 for females. The per capita income for the town was $10,244. About 29.4% of families and 43.9% of the population were below the poverty line, including 46.2% of those under age 18 and 27.0% of those age 65 or over.

See also

 List of towns in Louisiana

References

External links

Cities in Alexandria metropolitan area, Louisiana
Restoration Movement
Towns in Louisiana
Towns in Rapides Parish, Louisiana